Magpie is a town in the City of Ballarat, Victoria, Australia. During the 1850s, gold was found at Frenchmans Lead, which essentially created the township.

The town is home to Magpie Primary School. A small school, it attracts fewer than 100 students.

References

Suburbs of Ballarat